Dichomeris hypochloa is a moth in the family Gelechiidae. It was described by Walsingham in 1911. It is found in Mexico (Sonora) and the southern United States, where it has been recorded from Arizona.

The forewings are pale cream-ochreous, with a brownish spot at the end of the cell, preceded by another beyond the middle of the fold, both very faintly indicated. There is a strong dark chestnut-brown streak along the upper part of the termen. The hindwings are rosy grey, with a very pale ochreous cilia.

References

Moths described in 1911
hypochloa